Line 2 of the Xuzhou Metro is a rapid transit line in Xuzhou city, Jiangsu province, China. Construction commenced in February 2016, and the line was opened on November 28, 2020. It is the second metro line to open in Xuzhou.

Line 2 runs primarily north–south through Xuzhou's CBD and Xuzhou New District, from North Coach Station in the north to Xinchengqu East in the south.

Line overview

History 
Xuzhou Metro Line 2 officially began construction on February 22, 2016. As of September 2018, about half of the stations have begun main structure construction, while the other half have been capped successfully. Tunneling has begun on most stations, with eight stations having tunneled through for both tracks on the line.

Civil engineering work on Line 2 is expected to complete in May 2019, with railway work completing in October 2019. Installation of electromechanical equipment will complete in March 2020, railway adjustment work will complete in June 2020, rolling stock will be tested on the line from July 1 to September 30, 2020, and the line opened to traffic in November 2020.

As of 2018, the second phase has not begun construction; it will include six elevated stations to the south of Xinchengqu East Station.

References 

02
Railway lines opened in 2020